The Cheoah Bald salamander (Plethodon cheoah) is a species of salamander in the family Plethodontidae endemic to the state of North Carolina in the United States. Its natural habitat is temperate forests and it is threatened by habitat loss. It was formerly considered a variant of the red-cheeked salamander until it was found to be a distinct species.

References

Amphibians of the United States
Plethodon
Taxonomy articles created by Polbot
Amphibians described in 2000